The land hemisphere and water hemisphere are the hemispheres of Earth containing the largest possible total areas of land and ocean, respectively. By definition (assuming that the entire surface can be classed as either "land" or "ocean"), the two hemispheres do not overlap.

Determinations of the hemispheres vary slightly.

Distribution of geographical features 

The land hemisphere has the substantial majority of the planet's land (80.1 percent), including nearly all of Asia (with Maritime Southeast Asia being the only notable exception) and most of South America. Africa, Europe, and North America are solely within the land hemisphere. However, even in the land hemisphere, the water area still slightly exceeds the land area (with 53 percent water to 47 percent land). This hemisphere is almost identical to the hemisphere containing the greatest human population. The land hemisphere also contains most of Earth's inland waters, including the African Great Lakes, Eurasia's Caspian Sea, the Great Lakes of North America, and Lake Baikal in Siberia.

The water hemisphere has only about one-fifth of the world's land, including Easter Island, the Hawaiian Islands, other Pacific islands, Maritime Southeast Asia, the southern tip of the Indochinese Peninsula, the southern portion of the Malay Peninsula, the Ryukyu Islands, Taiwan, and the Southern Cone of the Americas. Antarctica, Australia, and Zealandia are solely within the water hemisphere. Some sources further divide land into "dry land" and "ice cap". Antarctica provides the water hemisphere with the majority of Earth's ice.

Most of the Pacific Ocean and the Indian Ocean, and the whole Southern Ocean, are in the water hemisphere. Proportionately, the water hemisphere is approximately 89 percent water (almost all pertaining to the World Ocean), 6 percent dry land and 5 percent polar ice cap.

The table below shows Alphonse Berget's estimates of the land area in each continent in the land and water hemispheres.

See also 
 Geographical centre of Earth

References 

Hemispheres of Earth
Oceans
Physical geography